In enzymology, a 27-hydroxycholesterol 7alpha-monooxygenase is an enzyme that catalyzes the chemical reaction

27-hydroxycholesterol + NADPH + H+ + O2  7alpha,27-dihydroxycholesterol + NADP+ + H2O

The 4 substrates of this enzyme are 27-hydroxycholesterol, NADPH, H+, and O2, whereas its 3 products are 7alpha,27-dihydroxycholesterol, NADP+, and H2O.

This enzyme belongs to the family of oxidoreductases, specifically those acting on paired donors, with O2 as oxidant and incorporation or reduction of oxygen. The oxygen incorporated need not be derived from O2 with NADH or NADPH as one donor, and incorporation of one atom o oxygen into the other donor.  The systematic name of this enzyme class is 27-hydroxycholesterol,NADPH:oxygen oxidoreductase (7alpha-hydroxylating). This enzyme is also called 27-hydroxycholesterol 7alpha-hydroxylase.  It employs one cofactor, heme-thiolate(P-450).

References

 

EC 1.14.13
NADPH-dependent enzymes
Heme enzymes
Enzymes of unknown structure